The 1981 Guatemalan Liga Nacional was the 30th edition of the Guatemalan Liga Nacional.  Comunicaciones F.C. won their 10th title after finishing first in the Final round.

Standings

Championship Round
Also known as the Octogonal

 Comunicaciones F.C. and Club Xelajú MC qualified to the 1982 CONCACAF Champions' Cup and the 1982 Copa Fraternidad.

Relegation Round

References

1981
Liga Nacional
Guatemala